Emarti is a town in Narok County, Kenya. The town is located in Kirindoni division, near Kilgoris. Emarti has a population of 18.300 (1999 census, total population of the Emarti location ).

The original people are the Kipsigis and a Maasai clan called Siria.

Populated places in Narok County